Nicholas Valentine Riasanovsky (December 21, 1923 – May 14, 2011) was a professor at the University of California, Berkeley and the author of numerous books on Russian history and European intellectual history.

Biography
Nicolai Valentinovitch Riasanovskiy was born in China on 21 December 1923 in Harbin (then in Russian Manchuria), the son of lawyer Valentin A. Riasanovsky and Antonina Riasanovsky, a novelist.  His father, Valentin, was a Russian professor, who had taught at Moscow University, Jaroslavl, Tomsk and Irkutsk and from 1922 to 1934 was teaching at Harbin Normal University (China).  His mother, Antonia, was a teacher and novelist who wrote under the pen name Nina Fedorova. In 1938 the family moved to the United States of America, where his father taught at the University of Oregon, and his mother's work The Family, about the life of a Russian community in a Chinese city, received The Atlantic Monthly Prize for fiction in 1940. Nicolas Riasanovsky graduated from the University of Oregon in 1942. During World War II, he trained in Army intelligence at Camp Ritchie and he is considered one of the Ritchie Boys. He received a master's degree from Harvard University in 1947, and a DPhil. from St. John's College, Oxford in 1949 on a Rhodes Scholarship.

From 1949 to 1957 Riasanovsky taught at the University of Iowa. During this time he published Russia in the West in the Teaching of the Slavophiles (1952), and spent a year in Finland as a Fulbright Scholar at the University of Helsinki (1954-1955).

From 1957 until his retirement in 1997 he taught at the University of California, Berkeley, and published Nicholas I and Official Nationality in Russia (1959) and his best-selling A History of Russia (1963). The latter was in its eighth edition in 2010 (now co-authored with Mark D. Steinberg, a former student of Riasanovsky's) and has been acclaimed for its continued comprehensiveness.

Riasanovsky died in Oakland, California, USA, on May 14, 2011, at the age of 87.

Bibliography
 Nicholas I and Official Nationality in Russia, 1825-1855 (1959)   online  no charge borrow
  A History of Russia (1963). 3rd edition online;  4th edition online  
 "Oral history transcript" (1998)  online

Notes

References
Daly, Jonathan, “The Pleiade: Five Scholars Who Founded Russian Historical Studies in America,” Kritika: Explorations in Russian and Eurasian History 18, no. 4 (Fall 2017): 785–826.
 New York Times obituary
Faculty profile at UC Berkeley
Oral History: Professor of Russian and European Intellectual History, University of California, Berkeley, 1957-1997

1923 births
2011 deaths
Historians of Russia
University of Oregon alumni
Harvard University alumni
Alumni of St John's College, Oxford
American Rhodes Scholars
University of California, Berkeley faculty
Russian Orthodox Christians from the United States
American people of Russian descent
Chinese emigrants to the United States
Ritchie Boys